The Men's individual pursuit event of the 2008 UCI Track Cycling World Championships was held on 26 March 2008.

Results

Qualifying

Finals

References

External links
 Full results at Tissottiming.com

Men's individual pursuit
UCI Track Cycling World Championships – Men's individual pursuit